The Macintosh LC II is a personal computer designed, manufactured, and sold by Apple Computer from March 1992 to March 1993. The LC II is an update to the original Macintosh LC, replacing its Motorola 68020 processor with a 68030 and increasing the onboard memory to 4 MB. The LC II was priced at US$1,699, fully $800 less than the original LC when it was introduced.

In September 1992, Apple introduced the Macintosh Performa family of consumer-oriented computers.  The LC II was repackaged as the Performa 400.  When LC II was replaced by the Macintosh LC III in early 1993, the LC II was discontinued in North America, and two new Performa models (the 405 and 430) were introduced in its place.  In October, the Performa 400, 405 and 430 were all discontinued and a new LC II-based model called the Performa 410 was introduced which became Apple's new entry-level computer. The LC II continued to be sold in some markets for some time after that.

The LC II was Apple's highest-selling Macintosh product in 1992.

Overview 
The LC II retains the original LC's 16-bit system bus and 10 MB RAM limit, making its performance roughly the same as the earlier model. The main benefit of the 68030 processor in the LC II is its onboard paged memory management unit, which System 7 uses to enable its new virtual memory feature. Apple had opted to get a quick update to the LC out the door instead of spending the additional time required to do a full architectural update, which would happen the following year with the Macintosh LC III.

The LC II was sold at the same time as the Macintosh IIsi, which was more than $800 more expensive than the LC II, but did not have its 10 MB memory limit, 16-bit data bus, and mono audio output.  The IIsi also includes a NuBus expansion slot that the LC II lacks, and can be powered on via a button on the keyboard, unlike the LC range which has a power switch on the back of the unit.

Hardware 

Case: The LC II retains its predecessor's pizza box form factor.  The design was updated during the LC II's production run when the auto-inject floppy drive was substituted for a manual-inject unit.  The revised front bezel no longer featured the horizontal indentation aligning with the floppy drive, a defining characteristic of the Snow White design language.

Logic board: The LC II retains much of the original LC's logic board design, including a 16-bit data path and a 10 MB memory limit.  These limitations limited the machine's ability to take full advantage of the 68030 CPU.

Storage: The LC II shipped with one floppy drive as standard, with options for 40 or 80 MB hard drives.  While the original LC had two internal floppy drive connectors, the LC II has one.  About 5% of the LC units sold had two floppy drives, and internal hard disks were becoming common by 1992, so the second connector was removed.

Video: The LC II's logic board has one video RAM slot, which is filled with a 256 KB SIMM as standard; the high-end configuration was shipped with a 512 KB SIMM instead.  VRAM SIMMs from the original LC are supported in the LC II.

Upgrades: Apple sold a $599 upgrade kit that replaced the LC II's logic board with that of the LC III.

Models 

Introduced March 23, 1992 (and discontinued March 15, 1993):
 Macintosh LC II: Sold in these configurations:
 4 MB RAM, 40 MB HDD. US$1,699.
 4 MB RAM, 80 MB HDD, 256 KB VRAM. US$1,849.
 4 MB RAM, 80 MB HDD, 512 KB VRAM. US$2,049.

Introduced September 14, 1992:
 Performa 400: 4 MB RAM, 512 KB VRAM, 80 MB HDD.

Introduced April 12, 1993:
 Performa 405: 4 MB RAM, 256 KB VRAM, 80 MB HDD.
 Performa 430: 4 MB RAM, 256 KB VRAM, 120 MB HDD.

Introduced October 18, 1993:
 Performa 410: 4 MB RAM, 512 KB VRAM, 80 MB HDD.

Timeline

References

External links 

 LC II, Performa 400, Performa 405, Performa 410, and Performa 430 specifications at everymac.com.
 Mac LC II at lowendmac.com.

II
LC II
LC II
Computer-related introductions in 1992